Robin Bartleman (born August 27, 1972) is an American legislator and educator serving as a member of the Florida House of Representatives from the 103rd district. She assumed office on November 3, 2020. She is a Democrat, supporting affordable housing, resolving the state's property insurance crisis, dealing with flooding and increasing healthcare affordability.

Education 
Bartleman earned a Bachelor of Science degree in emotionally handicapped education from Florida International University in 1994 and a Master of Science in emotional disturbance education from Nova Southeastern University.

Career 
Bartleman has worked as a special education teacher and assistant school principal in the Liberty City neighborhood of Miami. Bartleman served one term as a Commissioner for the City of Weston, Florida, from 2000-2004.

School Board 
Bartleman was a member of the Broward County School Board, representing a countywide seat, for 16 years, from 2004-2020. She was first elected in 2004 and was re-elected in 2008, 2012 and 2016.

She was also an advocate for children with disabilities, having been a teacher in the exceptional student educations (ESE) program in Miami for several years.

Florida House 
She was elected to the Florida House of Representatives in November 2020, succeeding Richard Stark. In the House, she is ranking member on the healthcare regulation subcommittee and also serves on the local administrations, federal affairs and special districts subcommittee of the State Affairs Committee, as well as the agriculture, conservation and resiliency subcommittee and the health care appropriations subcommittee.

The old 104th district included Pembroke Pines, Weston, Southwest Ranches and the Everglades Wildlife Management Area.

In 2022, she was re-elected to the redrawn 103rd district, defeating Republican George Navarini in a rematch of the 2020 election, even as a "red wave" overtook much of Florida. Her campaign manager was Barbara Miller of Hallandale Beach.

The new district moved south and west and now incorporates all of Broward County east of I-27, south and west of I-75, along with a slice of Pembroke Pines from Sheridan Street to Pembroke Road out to SW 136 Ave. Cities in the district include Weston, Pembroke Pines, Southwest Ranches, Miramar, Sunrise and Davie.

Bills passed and signed into law

Miya's Law 
The legislation is named in honor of Miya Marcano, a college student who was killed in her apartment in Orlando. The perpetrator, a maintenance worker with a criminal record, allegedly entered her unit using a master key. Miya's Law aims to improve safety measures for the approximately 2 million renters in the state by requiring apartment complexes to conduct background checks on employees who have access to tenants' homes, extending the notice period for maintenance worker entry from 12 to 24 hours, establishing policies for the issuance and return of master keys, and maintaining a log of employees who enter units. Additionally, in an effort to combat human trafficking, the law prohibits public lodging establishments from charging hourly rates. These provisions aim to increase security for renters in Florida.

Flood control (HB 513) 
The legislation includes $2 million in funding to expedite the study of the Central and Southern Florida (C&SF) Flood Control Project, which is an aging system of canals, drainage pumps, and gates that protect South Florida's 11 million residents, its economy, the freshwater aquifer, and the Everglades. The C&SF is experiencing increased strain due to rising sea levels and increased flooding. The bill, known as HB 513, aims to establish a system of accountability to ensure the necessary maintenance of the flood control system. Southeast Florida, which makes up over one third of Florida's economy, could potentially see job loss and a decline in tourism if the flood management systems are not properly maintained. The bill has received bipartisan support and was a priority for both Miami Dade and Broward County.

Serena's Law (HB 1229) 
In 2021, a bill was passed and signed into law that eliminated a loophole allowing the identity of adults with a minor protection injunction to remain anonymous. This means that employers, like school administrators and summer camps, are now able to find out the identity of the respondent in these cases.

Medicaid health disparities (HB 855) 
HB 855 is a bill aimed at increasing transparency in Florida's Medicaid program. The legislation aims to ensure that taxpayer dollars are used efficiently and effectively by requiring Medicaid programs to collect data on factors such as age, race, ethnicity, sex, and disability. This data will be used to address healthcare disparities and ensure that patients' needs are met. The COVID-19 pandemic has highlighted significant healthcare inequalities in the United States, and this bill aims to address this issue by attempting to improve access to high quality healthcare for Floridians.

Sea level rise resilience (HB 901) 
Tropical Storm Eta caused flooding in Bartleman's district, resulting in damage to water management infrastructure. In response, House Bill 901 was written to require the state to conduct a comprehensive assessment of future spending by federal, state, and local governments to address both coastal and inland flooding. This assessment aims to ensure that fiscally responsible decisions are made regarding flood prevention and mitigation. HB 901 was subsequently incorporated into Representative Bussata Cabrera's House Bill 7019, which focused on statewide flooding and sea level rise resilience. The combined legislation was signed into law in 2021.

Appropriations

2021 
In 2021, Bartleman obtained close to $1 million in funding for a new pump station in Pembroke Pines, mobile storm water pumps for the South Broward Drainage District to use during flooding events, and flood control projects in Southwest Ranches. These resources were obtained to help reduce the impact of flooding in the region.

2022 
Bartleman won awarded $2,000,000 to reevaluate and study South Florida's aging flood system with the goal of making future improvements. She also won a total of $1,671,894 for three Southwest Ranches drainage improvement projects.

Other legislation 
Bartleman voted against legislation to restrict abortion in Florida to 15 weeks, giving a speech on the House floor explaining her reasons for doing so. She also voted against the congressional redistricting plan passed in a special session. Bartleman also voted against the "Don't Say Gay" bill and the bill to repeal the Reedy Creek Improvement Act that stripped Disney of its special tax privileges after it spoke out against the "Don't Say Gay" bill.

Boards and organizations 

 Florida PTA, Lifelong Member
 Pembroke Pines Miramar Regional Chamber of Commerce, 2020–Present
 Broward County Environmental Caucus, 2019–Present
 St. Bonaventure Usher Ministry, 2015–Present
 Moms Demand Action, 2014–Present
 Mujeras Latinas, 2005–Present
 American Association of University Women, 2004–Present
 Broward County Climate Change Taskforce, 2016 - 2020
 Broward County Comprehensive School Health Advisory Committee Member, 2014 - 2020
 Circuit 17 Juvenile Justice Advisory Board Member, 2012 - 2020
 Take Stock in Children Mentor, 2009 - 2020
 Past Chair and Board Member of Broward County Children's Services Council, 2008 - 2020
 Broward County Children's Services Council Special Needs Advisory Coalition Chair, 2006 - 2020
 Broward County Value Adjustment Board, 2009 - 2012 
 Broward Early Learning Coalition Board Member, 2004 - 2012

Other professional experience 

 Teacher of Students with Severe Emotional and Behavioral Disabilities, 1994 - 2000

Awards 

 Florida Policy Institute's Policy Pioneer Award for spearheading policy to improve health equity and children's well-being, 2022
 FEA, Freshman Legislative Friend of Public Education Award, 2021
 Florida League of Cities Legislative Appreciation Award, 2021
 Florida School Board Association Legislator of the Year, 2021
 Miramar-Pembroke Pines Regional Chamber of Commerce Community Leadership Award, 2021
 Florida PTA Lifetime Membership Recognition, 2020
 Broward AFL-CIO Service Award, 2019
 Broward Young Democrats Young at Heart Award, 2019
 Broward AFL-CIO Service Award, 2019
 Florida Initiative for Suicide Prevention Humanitarian Award, 2018
 Smith Community Mental Health Foundation Drive to Thrive Award, 2018
 Florida Initiative for Suicide Prevention FISPY Humanitarian Award, 2018
 Smith Community Mental Health Foundation Drive to Thrive Award, 2018
 Broward County Historical Commission Certificate of Appreciation for Dedication to our Community and Public Service, 2015
 Broward College Recognition of Valuable Contributions to the Social and Behavioral Science Department, 2015
 Broward County PTA – Certificate of Appreciation for Outstanding Service to Children and Youth in the Community, 2014
 Shooting Star Award – Catholic Hospice, 2014
 League of Women Voters of Florida, Up and Coming Future Leader and Young Elected to Watch, 2012 
 Broward County Young Democrats Bob Gross Young Democrat of the Year, 2012
 Early Learning Coalition of Broward Inc. Certificate of Appreciation, 2011
 The Center for Independent Living of Broward, Advocate of Distinction, 2010
 Sistrunk Historical Festival Outstanding Achievement Honoree, 2009
 Florida School Counselor Association Advocate of the Year, 2009
 American Jewish Congress Distinguished Civic Achievement Award, 2009
 Community Builder's Award from the Caribbean American Democratic Club, 2009
 Deerfield Beach Democratic Club Honoree, 2009
 National Alliance on Mental Illness Honoree, 2008
 American Women's Business Association Award - School Board Member of the Year, 2007
 Black Elected Officials Community Service Award, 2007
 Certified Board Member Program sponsored by the Florida School Board Association, 2007
 Outstanding Mother – Healthy Mothers-Healthy Babies Coalition of Broward County 2006
 Martin Luther King Jr Humanitarian Award , City of Weston, 2006
 Outstanding Mother of the Year from the Healthy Mothers – Healthy Babies Coalition of Broward County, 2006
 Koinonia Worship Center and Village Center Certificate of Appreciation, 2006
 Dolphins Democrats President's Award, 2005
 Broward Young Democrats' Trailblazer of the Year, 2004

References 

1972 births
Democratic Party members of the Florida House of Representatives
Florida International University alumni
Nova Southeastern University alumni
Women state legislators in Florida
21st-century American politicians
21st-century American women politicians
Living people